Biol may refer to:

Abbreviation for Biology
Biol, a commune of the Isère département, in France